The IFFHS World's Best Club is a football award given annually since 1991 to the world's best club. The award is given by the International Federation of Football History & Statistics (IFFHS), the entity has also produced a monthly Club World Ranking.

The ranking takes into consideration the results of twelve months of continental and intercontinental competitions, national league matches (including play-offs) and the most important national cup (excluding points won before the round of 16).

All countries are rated at four levels based upon the national league performance—clubs in the highest level leagues receive 4 points for each match won, 2 for a draw and 0 for a defeat. Level 2 is assigned 3 pts. (win), 1.5 (draw) and 0 (lost), and so on with the next lower levels.

In continental competitions, all clubs receive the same number of points at all stages regardless of the performance level of their leagues. However, the UEFA Champions League and the Copa Libertadores yield more points than UEFA Europa League and Copa Sudamericana, respectively. The point assignment system is still lower for the AFC, CAF, CONCACAF and OFC continental tournaments. Competitions between two continents are evaluated depending upon their importance. Competitions not organized by a continental confederation, or any intercontinental events not recognized by FIFA, are not taken into consideration.

Criteria

Men's winners

List of winners

Statistics

Continental rankings 

 Bold indicates the World's Best Man Club winner.

Continental Men's Clubs of the Century (1901–2000) 

In 2009, the IFFHS released the results of a statistical study series which determined the best continental clubs of the 20th century. The ranking did not consider the performance of the teams in national football tournaments (except in the Oceania's club ranking due to limited editions held under OFC club competitions), the performance in the intercontinental or worldwide club competitions or those submitted in the IFFHS Club World Ranking, available since 1991.

Based on this study, which assigned a weighted score criteria applied for each competition analysed, the below six clubs were named as "continental clubs of the century" by the IFFHS between 10 September and 13 October 2009. These clubs were awarded with a golden trophy and a certificate during the World Football Gala celebrated at Fulham, London, on 11 May 2010.

The World's Best Man Club of the Decade (2001–2010) 
In 2012, the IFFHS recognised Barcelona as the World's Best Club Team of the Decade for the first decade of the 21st century (2001–2010).

The World's Best Man Club of the Decade (2011–2020) 
In 2021, Barcelona were recognised as the world's best club also for the second decade (2011–2020).

Women's winners

List of winners

Statistics

Continental rankings 
 Bold indicates the World's Best Woman Club winner.

The World's Best Woman Club of the Decade (2011–2020) 
In 2021, Lyon were recognised as the world's best club for the second decade (2011–2020).

See also 
International Federation of Football History & Statistics
IFFHS World's Best Player
IFFHS World's Best Goalkeeper
IFFHS World's Best Top Goal Scorer
IFFHS World's Best International Goal Scorer
IFFHS World Team
IFFHS World's Best Club Coach
IFFHS World's Best National Coach

References 

International Federation of Football History & Statistics
Association football trophies and awards
History of association football